Simonas Serapinas (born February 24, 1982) is a Lithuanian professional basketball player. He is 1.97 m and weights 98 kg. His primary position is forward.

Pro career
He started his professional career in 2000, playing for Kaunas „LKKA-Atletas". He also played in Alita Alytus and BC Nevėžis. In 2003 he started to play for Žalgiris Kaunas, for which he played until 2006.
Later he played for Greek Aris, Polish Prokom Trefl Sopot and Ukrainian Azovmash Mariupol, also in Telekom Baskets Bonn of German League. He also had stints in Neptūnas and Pallacanestro Varese.

On January 15, 2015 he signed BC Mažeikiai of the Lietuvos krepšinio lyga.

Career statistics

Euroleague

|-
| style="text-align:left;"| 2003–04
| style="text-align:left;"| Žalgiris
| 4 || 1 || 7.2 || .500 || .000 || .500 || .3 || .0 || .5 || .0 || 1.3 || 0.1
|-
| style="text-align:left;"| 2004–05
| style="text-align:left;"| Žalgiris
| 11 || 4 || 14.5 || .333 || .353 || .714 || 1.9 || .5 || .2 || .0 || 4.6 || 1.1
|-
| style="text-align:left;"| 2005–06
| style="text-align:left;"| Žalgiris
| 19 || 10 || 20.4 || .574 || .417 || .727 || 1.9 || 1.1 || 1.3 || .1 || 8.1 || 7.3
|-
| style="text-align:left;"| 2006–07
| style="text-align:left;"| Aris
| 19 || 6 || 9.2 || .500 || .409 || .533 || 1.5 || .1 || .3 || .1 || 2.7 || 2.3
|-
| style="text-align:left;"| 2007–08
| style="text-align:left;"| Aris
| 11 || 0 || 11.5 || .625 || .300 || .000 || 1.8 || .4 || .2 || .1 || 2.5 || 2.0

Awards and achievements
LKL Champion - 2004, 2005
Baltic League Champion - 2005
Greek A1 League 3rd place - 2007
Polish League Champion - 2008

Notes

References
, FIBA Europe.

1982 births
Living people
Aris B.C. players
Asseco Gdynia players
Basketball players from Klaipėda
BC Azovmash players
BC Nevėžis players
BC Žalgiris players
Forwards (basketball)
Lithuanian men's basketball players
Pallacanestro Varese players
Telekom Baskets Bonn players